Guarani, Guaraní or Guarany may refer to

Ethnography 
 Guaraní people, an indigenous people from South America's interior (Brazil, Argentina, Paraguay and Bolivia)
 Guaraní language, or Paraguayan Guarani, an official language of Paraguay
 Guarani dialects, spoken in Argentina, Brazil, Bolivia, and Paraguay
 Guarani languages, a group of languages, including Guarani, in the Tupí-Guaraní language subfamily
 Eastern Bolivian Guarani, historically called Chiriguanos, living in the eastern Bolivian foothills of the Andes. Also called Ava Guarani.

Economics 
 Paraguayan guaraní, the currency of Paraguay

Education 
 The Guarini School of Graduate and Advanced Studies, a subunit of Dartmouth College

Geography 
 Guarani, Minas Gerais, Brazil
 Guarani de Goiás, Brazil
 Guarani das Missões, Rio Grande do Sul, Brazil
 Guarani Aquifer, a large underground water reservoir in South America

Literature and music 
 The Guarani, an 1857 novel by José de Alencar
 Il Guarany, an opera by Carlos Gomes, based on the above novel
 Guarany (film), a 1948 Italian film directed by Riccardo Freda

Machines 
 FMA IA 50 Guaraní II, an Argentine utility aircraft
 VBTP-MR, a Brazilian 6x6 armored personnel carrier

Association football (soccer) clubs 
Brazil
 Guarani Esporte Clube (CE), Juazeiro do Norte
 Guarani Esporte Clube (MG), Divinópolis
 Guarani Futebol Clube, Campinas
 Guarany Futebol Clube, Bagé
 Guarany Futebol Clube (Camaquã)
 Guarany Sporting Club, Sobral
 Associação Atlética Guarany, Porto da Folha
 Esporte Clube Guarani, Venâncio Aires
 Sociedade Esportiva, Recreativa e Cultural Guarani, Palhoça
 Sport Club Guarany, Cruz Alta

Paraguay
 Club Guaraní, Asunción
 Guaraní F.B.C., Trinidad

Astronomy 
 Guarani, official name of exoplanet HD 23079 b

People 
Horacio Guarany (1925-2017), Argentinian singer & writer

See also 
 Guarini (disambiguation), an Italian name

Language and nationality disambiguation pages